Amanita cinereovelata is a species of the fungal family Amanitaceae. It was the first generic report for Bangladesh, described as a new species to science in 2015. This species belongs to the subgenus Lepidella section Lepidella. It is only known from Bangladesh, and putatively ectomycorrhizal association with Shorea robusta.

See also

List of Amanita species

References

External links

cinereovelata
Fungi of Bangladesh